Chicmah Obodo is a Nigerian judoka who competed in the women's category. She  won a bronze medal at the 1999 All-Africa Games in the –70 kg category.

Sports career 
In 1999, she participated in the All-Africa Games held in Johannesburg, South Africa. She won a bronze medal in the women's 70kg event.

References 

Nigerian female judoka

Living people
20th-century births
Year of birth missing (living people)
African Games medalists in judo
African Games bronze medalists for Nigeria
Competitors at the 1999 All-Africa Games